Stalker Hall is the current home of the College of Arts and Sciences at Indiana State University.  Originally named the Education & Social Studies Building upon completion in 1954, it was renamed Stalker Hall in 1966 in honor of Francis Marion Stalker, a long-member of the Faculty from 1892–1929.

From 2004–2005, it underwent a $5.5 million renovation which addressed structural, technological and cosmetic deficiencies.  It is now fully compliant with the Americans with Disabilities Act's standards.

 Architect: Ralph O. Yeager
 Contractor:  J.L. Simmons Co., Inc. and Nehf Hardware & Electric Co., Terre Haute
 Initial Cost:  ~$920,000
 Renovated: 2004–2006  Classrooms now contain the latest technology, Additional elevators were added, Energy-efficient windows and doors were installed, A new facade was added to the southern entrance of building, "tying" it to the Quadrangle.
 Notes:  This is the second Indiana State University building to bear the name Stalker Hall, the initial building was the 'Laboratory School' constructed in 1905 and razed in 1953.

External links
 College of Arts and Sciences

Indiana State University
Buildings and structures in Terre Haute, Indiana
Buildings_and_structures_in_Vigo_County,_Indiana
Art Deco architecture in Indiana